Snoopy's Magic Show, also known as Snoopy: Magic Show, is an action puzzle video game based on the Snoopy cartoon characters licensed from Peanuts. It was developed and published by Kemco, which was released for the Game Boy in 1990.

Gameplay

The player controls Snoopy who has to save four Woodstocks, within a fixed amount of time, by dodging bouncing balls, pushing blocks, using warp zones and power-ups. There are 120 levels with a unique password to access each. In the multiplayer mode, one player is Spike while the other is Snoopy.

Sequel
In 1996, Kemco released another Snoopy game for the Game Boy exclusively in Japan, entitled Snoopy no Hajimete no Otsukai. The game made use of features of the Super Game Boy and is the second Japan-exclusive Peanuts game, after Snoopy Concert.

Notes

See also
 List of Peanuts media

References

1990 video games
Game Boy-only games
Kemco games
Video games based on Peanuts
Puzzle video games
Video games developed in Japan
Multiplayer and single-player video games
Game Boy games
Video games about dogs